CJ Logistics Corporation is a logistics company headquartered in Seoul, South Korea. It is the oldest and largest parcel delivery firm in South Korea.

History

Korea Express
Korea Express was established as Chosun Rice Warehousing in 1930. It became a subsidiary of Dong-ah Group in 1968, but the creditors sold Korea Express when Dong-ah entered a government-sponsored debt workout program in 2003.

In 2008, a consortium led by Kumho Asiana Group was selected as the preferred bidder to buy Korea Express. Kumho Asiana, a South Korean conglomerate that operates Asiana Airlines, acquired Korea Express for 4.1 trillion won (US$ 4.34 billion) to expand its cargo business into the inland transportation business.

CJ Logistics
However, Kumho Asiana had to sell Korea Express as it faced a severe cash shortage during the financial crisis in 2008. After competing with the Samsung SDS-POSCO consortium, CJ Group acquired a 40 percent stake in Korea Express for 1.91 trillion won. CJ changed the company name to CJ Korea Express and merged with its existing logistics affiliate CJ GLS. In 2017, the company was rebranded as CJ Logistics from CJ Korea Express.

References

External links
 

CJ Group
Companies listed on the Korea Exchange
1930 establishments in Korea
Transport companies established in 1930
Logistics companies of South Korea